Traverse Anatole Le Goff (born August 5, 1983) is a South African actor and politician who has served as a Member of the National Assembly of South Africa since November 2022. As a member of the Democratic Alliance, South Africa's official opposition, Le Goff had previously served as a Councillor of the City of Cape Town.

Early life and education
Le Goff was born in Johannesburg, Gauteng and he grew up in Northcliff and on the Atlantic Seaboard in Cape Town. Le Goff matriculated from Northcliff High School. He has a Bachelor of Arts degree in Politics, Philosophy and Economics, and is completing an honours degree in International Politics from the University of South Africa.

Career
In November 2021, Le Goff was elected to the City of Cape Town council as a proportional representation councillor for the DA. He served on the Energy Portfolio Committee as well as the Future Planning and Resilience Portfolio Committee. In his capacity as a representative of the City of Cape Town, Le Goff attended a public hearing on the Climate Change Bill conducted by the Parliamentary Portfolio Committee on Environment, Forestry and Fisheries in October 2022.

On 10 November 2022, Le Goff was named the replacement for former DA MP Christopher Mario Fry. He was sworn in as a Member of the National Assembly in the Parliament of the Republic of South Africa on 16 November 2022.

Television

References

External links 
Profile at Parliament of South Africa

Living people
1983 births
Politicians from Cape Town
Democratic Alliance (South Africa) politicians
21st-century South African actors
Members of the National Assembly of South Africa
South African people of French descent